Plitka poezija (trans. Shallow Poetry) is the Serbian punk rock band Pekinška Patka debut album, released in 1980 by Jugoton. The album is the first punk rock album released in Serbia.

The album was polled in 1998 as the 77th on the list of 100 greatest Yugoslav rock and pop albums in the book YU 100: najbolji albumi jugoslovenske rok i pop muzike (YU 100: The Best albums of Yugoslav pop and rock music).

Track listing
All tracks by Nebojša Čonkić and Sreten Kovačević except where noted. All tracks arranged by Pekinška Patka except track 2 (Brooker and Reid, arranged by Čonkić), track 4 (Clarke, Nash, arranged by Čonkić) and track 14 (Addrisi, Addrisi, arranged by Čonkić).

Personnel

The band
 Boris Oslovčan "Bora" — bass, backing vocals
 Laslo Pihler "Laci" — drums, backing vocals
 Sreten Kovačević "Srele" — guitar, backing vocals
 Nebojša Čonkić "Čonta" — vocals

Additional personnel
 Marko Pešić — photography
 Slobodan Konjović — producer, remix
 Ivan Vlatković — sound engineer

Cover versions
 Serbian punk rock band Atheist Rap, on their 1994 debut album Maori i Crni Gonzales, recorded the five-minute track "Plitka poezija", featuring a medley of songs from the album, including "Bela šljiva", "Kratkovidi magarac", "Bolje da nosim kratku kosu", "Biti ružan, pametan i mlad", "Ori, ori" and "Never my love".
 American hardcore punk band The Final Soulutions, on their 7" EP Return To The Motherland, recorded cover versions of "Kontracepcija" and "Poderimo rock".

References

External links and other sources
 Plitka poezija at Discogs
 EX YU ROCK enciklopedija 1960-2006, Janjatović Petar; 

Pekinška Patka albums
1980 debut albums
Jugoton albums